A Night at Birdland Vol. 1 is a 1954 release by jazz artist Art Blakey, and a quintet which featured Clifford Brown, Lou Donaldson, Horace Silver and Curly Russell. One of the earliest hard bop recordings, it was first released by Blue Note Records as a 10" LP (BLP 5037) and then as a 12" LP (BLP 1521) containing material from the second 10" album. It was reissued for the first time on CD in 1987 with two additional tracks (an alternate take of Wee-Dot and an improvisational piece titled Blues), previously released on a 2 LP Compilation in 1975 called Live Messengers (BN-LA473-J2). The CD was reissued again in 2001 as an "RVG Edition" remastered by Rudy Van Gelder with the tracks in a different order. The 1987 CD used the second 12" LP cover, the 2001 CD revived the original 10" LP cover.

All of the music surfaced as part of a Clifford Brown box set for Mosaic Records (MR5-104) and a complete Clifford Brown set put out by Capitol has also appeared.

The recording was produced by Alfred Lion and engineered by Rudy Van Gelder for Blue Note. The reissues were produced by Michael Cuscuna. The spoken announcement by Pee Wee Marquette is sampled in the US3 song "Cantaloop (Flip Fantasia)"

Track listing

10" LP

12" LP

CD Reissues

Personnel 
Art Blakey Quintet:
Art Blakey – drums
Clifford Brown – trumpet
Lou Donaldson – alto saxophone
Horace Silver – piano
Curley Russell – bass

Production:
Bob Blumenthal, Leonard Feather — liner notes
Michael Cuscuna — reissue producer
John Hermansader or Reid Miles — cover design
Alfred Lion — producer
Ron McMaster — digital transfers (1987)
Rudy Van Gelder — engineer, mastering (1954 and 2001)
Francis Wolff — photography

Reception 

The two albums that were released from the Birdland sessions are considered by The Penguin Guide to Jazz to be part of their "core collection." A reviewer for allaboutjazz.com said simply that "Blakey and company had clicked that night at Birdland." Allmusic mentions that, on this first album, "all of the participants [are] in inspired form. Classic bop.". Bob Blumenthal, renowned hard-bop writer, refers to this as a historical jazz milestone.

References 

1954 live albums
Albums produced by Alfred Lion
Albums produced by Michael Cuscuna
Art Blakey live albums
Blue Note Records live albums
Capitol Records live albums
Albums with cover art by Reid Miles
United States National Recording Registry recordings
Albums recorded at Birdland
United States National Recording Registry albums